Jalalpur is a village in Rohtak district of Haryana, India.

References

Villages in Rohtak district